Rya Weickert Zobel (born December 18, 1931) is a Senior United States District Court Judge of the United States District Court for the District of Massachusetts.

Education and career

Born in Zwickau, Germany, Zobel received an Artium Baccalaureus degree from Radcliffe College in 1953 and a Bachelor of Laws from Harvard Law School in 1956. She was a law clerk to George Clinton Sweeney, then Chief Judge of the United States District Court for the District of Massachusetts from 1956 to 1966. She was in private practice in Boston, Massachusetts from 1967 to 1979.

Federal judicial service

On January 25, 1979, Zobel was nominated by President Jimmy Carter to a new seat on the United States District Court for the District of Massachusetts created by 92 Stat. 1629. She was confirmed by the United States Senate on March 21, 1979, and received her commission on March 23, 1979. Among her judicial duties, she was director of the Federal Judicial Center from 1995 to 1999. She assumed senior status on April 1, 2014. Zobel served as a judge  in the 2019 college admissions bribery scandal.

In 2020,  she received the Edward J. Devitt Distinguished Service to Justice Award, the highest honor bestowed upon an Article III federal judge in the United States.

In 2021,  she was a recipient of the Outstanding Americans by Choice award from U.S. Citizenship and Immigration Services.  The award recognizes the outstanding achievements of naturalized U.S. citizens.

References

Sources
 

1931 births
Living people
German emigrants to the United States
Radcliffe College alumni
Harvard Law School alumni
Judges of the United States District Court for the District of Massachusetts
United States district court judges appointed by Jimmy Carter
20th-century American judges
People from Zwickau
21st-century American judges
20th-century American women judges
21st-century American women judges